Unsound may refer to:

 Unsound (Mission of Burma album), 2012
 Unsound (compilation album), a 2006 compilation album on Epitaph Records
 Unsound Festival, a music festival that takes place in Krakow, Poland, and around the world

See also
Mental disorder ("unsound mind")
Soundness, a concept in deductive reasoning (sound or unsound argument)
 Unsound Methods, a 1997 music album by Recoil
 Unsounded, a 2010 web graphic novel by Ashley Cope